David Pirie Webster, OBE (Born: September 18, 1928) is a Scottish author, historian, and sports promoter currently living in Glasgow who received an OBE for his services to sport. David has also been the organizer of the Highland Games in Largs for over 50 years.

Life and career
David Webster was born in 1928. He completed a degree in physical education at Teachers Training College, in Aberdeen, and as a public school teacher before turning to community recreation and sports promotion work in Scotland. As an author, Webster has published hundreds of articles in a wide variety of academic and popular journals.

Webster is currently the Scottish Weightlifting Chairman and served as the Scottish weightlifting national coach, as well as referee, and competitor in that sport. He attended the 1960, 1968, and 1972 Olympics as part of the Scottish delegation and worked at the World & European Championships in 1961, 62, 63, 64, 65, and 66 as either a technical official, referee, or coach. Webster was coach of the British team at the Commonwealth Weightlifting Championships in Malta in 1983, and he also served for many years as Scottish National Weightlifting Coach. Webster also competed in weightlifting and in the sport of powerlifting. Webster has also been an official in bodybuilding, and was a founding member of the National Amateur Bodybuilding Association (NABBA).

Highland Games and World Highland Games Heavy Events Championships
In the 1960s, Webster began promoting the Highland games internationally as a way to bring tourists to Scotland and helped to revive some of the traditional Scottish sports such as stone-lifting and caber-tossing. He founded the World Highland Games Heavy Events Championships in 1980. The Championships has now been held in New Zealand, Canada, USA, Finland, Australia, Nigeria, and Scotland. The 2009 Championships, held in Scotland, was attended by 47,000 people including Charles, Duke of Rothesay, Camilla, Duchess of Rothesay, and many civic leaders. In 2013, Webster was invited to California at the request of former governor Arnold Schwarzenegger for the commencement of Arnold Highland Games as part of the Arnold Classic.

Strongman
Webster promoted the first televised strongman contest in 1955, which consisted of stone-lifting and weightlifting, and was later asked by Trans World International to serve as a consultant as they formed their World's Strongest Man television show in the late 1970s. Webster was also invited by Terry Todd to be part of the creation of the Arnold Strongman Classic, held annually as part of the Arnold Sports Festival in Columbus Ohio. He served as head official at that event for 14 years.

Selected bibliography
 The Iron Game: An Illustrated History of Weightlifting (1976)
 Scottish Highland Games (1959)
 Complete Physique Book (1963)
 Lifting Illustrated (1966)
 The Development of the Clean And Jerk (1967)
 The Iron Game: An Illustrated History of Weightlifting (1976)
 Bodybuilding--An Illustrated History (1982)
 Donald Dinnie: The First Sporting Superstar (1999)
 World History of Highland Games (2011)

References

External links
 World Heavy Events Official Site

Scottish non-fiction writers
World's Strongest Man
Living people
Highland games
Officers of the Order of the British Empire
1928 births